The following is a list of gig economy companies. The list includes only companies that have been noted by sources as being former or current gig economy companies.

Background
The Congressional Research Service defines the "gig economy" as: the collection of markets that match providers to consumers on a gig (or job) basis in support of on-demand commerce. In the basic model, gig workers enter into formal agreements with on-demand companies to provide services to company's clients. Prospective clients request services through an Internet-based technological platform or smartphone application that allows them to search for providers or to specify jobs. Providers (gig workers) engaged by the on-demand company provide the requested service and are compensated for the jobs.

In 2019, Queensland University of Technology published a report stating 7% of Australians participate in the gig economy. 10% of the American workforce participated in the gig economy in 2018. According to a 2019 Bank of Canada report, 18% of Canadians worked in the gig economy for non-recreational reasons. Around 2018, 15% of China's workforce, representing over 110 million people, was involved in the gig economy. In 2019, the World Bank estimated that globally, fewer than 0.5% of people in the "active labor force" take part in the gig economy.

List of gig economy companies

Accommodation

Caregiving

Delivery

Grocery

Food

Education

Knowledge Work (Freelancing platforms)

Business and technical services

Creative services

Home services

Health services

Legal services

Retail

Transportation and parking

Notes

See also
 Business model
 Peer-to-peer
 Sharing economy
 Temporary work
 Crowdsourcing

References
Footnotes

Bibliography

Further reading
 

Business models
Gig economy
Online companies